The Brunei national futsal team is controlled by the Football Association of Brunei Darussalam, the governing body for futsal in Brunei and represents the country in international futsal competitions.

Tournaments

FIFA Futsal World Cup
 1989 – Did not enter
 1992 – Did not enter
 1996 – Did not enter
 2000 – Did not enter
 2004 – Did not enter
 2008 – Did not qualify
 2012 – Did not enter
 2016 – Did not qualify
 2020 – To be determined

AFC Futsal Championship
 1999 - Did not enter
 2000 - Did not enter
 2001 - Did not enter
 2002 – Group stage
 2003 - Withdrew
 2004 – Did not enter
 2005 – Did not enter
 2006 – Did not enter
 2007 – Did not enter
 2008 – Did not qualify
 2010 – Did not enter
 2012 – Did not enter
 2014 – Did not qualify
 2016 – Did not qualify
 2018 – Did not qualify

AFF Futsal Championship
 2001 – 4th place
 2003 – Group stage
 2005 – 4th place
 2006 – Group stage
 2007 – Group stage
 2008 – 4th place
 2012 – Group stage
 2013 – Group stage
 2014 – Group stage
 2015 – Group stage
 2016 – Group stage
 2017 – Group stage
 2018 – Group stage

Players

Current squad 
The following players were called up for the 2018 AFF Futsal Championship in Indonesia on 5–11 November 2018.

Coaches
  Yunos Yusof (2003)
  Rosanan Samak (2005–2007)
  Yunos Yusof (2008–2014)
  Azmanuddin Gillen (2015)
  Mehmet Fatih Kale (2016)
  Qusmaini Noor Rusli (2017)
  Yunos Yusof (2017–)

Results and fixtures
2017 AFF Futsal Championship

2018 AFF Futsal Championship

References

External links
 National Football Association of Brunei Darussalam

Brunei
National sports teams of Brunei